Nigeen Lake (alternatively spelled as Nageen Lake) is a mildly eutrophic lake located in Srinagar, Jammu and Kashmir, India. It is sometimes considered a part of the Dal lake and is connected to it via a narrow strait. It is also connected to the Khushal Sar and Gil Sar lakes via a channel known as Nallah Amir Khan.

Etymology 
The Nigeen lake is surrounded by a large number of willow and poplar trees. Hence, it has come to be referred as a "nageena", which means "the jewel in the ring". The word "nigeen" is a local variant of the same word.

Location 
The lake is located adjacent to the Hari Parbat hillock, to the west of the Dal lake.
To its north and west, lie the localities of Baghwanpora and Lal Bazar while to its north east lies the locality of Hazratbal, which is known for the famous shrine.

Present status 
The lake is a major tourist attraction in Srinagar, known for its relatively pristine waters as compared to the Dal lake. Houseboats and shikaras are a usual sight. Its also ideal for swimming, being deeper and less crowded than the Dal lake. The colonial era Nigeen Club is situated on the eastern shore of the lake.

However, as is the problem with other water bodies in the Kashmir Valley, the lake also suffers from encroachments which are deteriorating its water quality and also increasing the risk of floods. As such, the government of Jammu and Kashmir is engaged in taking steps to help improve the condition of the lake and restore it to its original glory.

References 

Lakes of Jammu and Kashmir
Srinagar
Tourist attractions in Srinagar